Sergey Yevgenevich Zhukov (born 22 May 1976) is a Russian pop musician. He first emerged as the lead singer for the band Hands Up! in 1996, alongside Aleksey Potekhin.

Early life
Zhukov was born on May 22, 1976, in a Russian-Tatar family.

Discography

Solo albums
2002: Territory
2004: Territory. Tenderness
2007: In Search of Tenderness

References

External links
 

1976 births
Living people
Russian dance musicians
Russian pop musicians
Russian radio personalities
Russian DJs
Russian record producers
20th-century Russian male singers
20th-century Russian singers
Russian pop singers
Russian television presenters
Russian people of Tatar descent
21st-century Russian male singers
21st-century Russian singers